Lodha or Macrotech Developers (formerly known as Lodha Developers) is an Indian multinational real estate company headquartered in Mumbai, India. It was founded in 1980 by Mangal Prabhat Lodha. It has developed residential and commercial properties in Mumbai, Thane, Hyderabad, Pune and London. Some of its notable projects include Lodha Altamount, The World Towers, Lodha Bellissimo, Trump Tower Mumbai and Lodha Park. The company is also credited for developing Palava, an integrated smart city near Mumbai. The company was listed as Macrotech Developers on 19 April 2021.

History 
Lodha Group was established by 1980 by Mangal Lodha, a businessman and politician, who serves as Member of Legislative Assembly.

Which was developed into Lodha Altamount.

In Q3 of 2020, India Ratings and Research (Ind-Ra) and Moody's upgraded the rating for Lodha to stable. After getting listed on stock exchange, Moody's Investors Service changed the outlook on the ratings to positive from stable in April 2021.

The company launched its initial public offering on 7 April 2021. It got listed on National Stock Exchange of India and Bombay Stock Exchange on 19 April 2021.

In September 2021, Tata Power entered into a partnership agreement with the group for setting up EV charging stations in housing societies and offices.

Partnership 
In September 2013, Lodha Group partnered with Donald Trump for the development of Trump Tower Mumbai, an 800-ft-tall, 77-storey residential tower at Lower Parel, Mumbai. Lodha Group has partnered with a number of celebrities to be brand ambassadors, including Aishwarya Rai, Amitabh Bachchan, Akshay Kumar and Twinkle Khanna.

Controversy 
A buyer of Lodha Group's Wadala project flat published YouTube videos claiming irregularities by the company. The company sued the lady and her partner for defamation but lost the case in the court.

Awards 
 'Top Developer of the Year' for the project, The World Towers at the Times Real Estate Icons West India by The Times of India (2020)
 The World Towers of Lodha Group received recognition as 'Project of the Year' and 'Top Super Luxury' segment homes and Palava City was recognised as 'Top Township Project' at the Times Real Estate Icons of West India (2020)
 Outstanding Project of the Year (National Category) for Palava at Golden Brick Awards, Dubai (2019)
 Lodha Group's CEO & MD Abhishek Lodha was named 'Real Estate Youth Icon of the Year 2019' award at Grohe Hurun Real Estate Leadership Summit (2019)
 CNBC Awaaz Real Estate Award for the project, Lodha Altamount by CNBC (2018)
 Global Leadership in Real Estate Award at NDTV Property Awards by NDTV (2014)
 CNBC Awaaz Real Estate Award for the project, Lodha Bellezza by CNBC (2013)

See also 

 List of tallest buildings in India
 List of tallest buildings in Mumbai

References

External links 
 
 
 Indian Property Firm Lodha Cuts Bond Size Despite 12% Yield at The Wall Street Journal

Real estate companies of India
Indian companies established in 1980
Companies listed on the National Stock Exchange of India
Companies listed on the Bombay Stock Exchange
Publicly traded companies